Pickett is an unincorporated community in Adair County, Kentucky, United States.  Its elevation is 676 feet (206 m).

References

Unincorporated communities in Adair County, Kentucky
Unincorporated communities in Kentucky